"The Old Man and his Grandson" is a German fairy tale collected by the Brothers Grimm in Grimm's Fairy Tales as tale number 78.

It is Aarne-Thompson type 980B, The Wooden Bowl.

Synopsis
A man whose hands shook with the tremors of old age could not eat neatly and often spilled his soup, so his son and daughter-in-law barred him from their table and made him eat by the stove.

When he broke the fine stoneware bowl from which he had been eating, they bought him a wooden bowl that could not break.  His four-year-old grandson played with wood as well and said that he was making a trough for his parents to eat from when they were old.  After that, they let him eat at the table again and did not complain about the spill.

Elements
The bowl was described as costing a few heller.

Variants
Other tales of this type vary on the exact offense that the grandson declares he will commit and the son thereafter refrains from: making his father sleep under half a blanket in the stables, bringing back the carrier so he can carry his father to abandon him, or commit murder.  In medieval Europe, the son was commonly sent for a blanket and came back with half, justifying it by saying the other half is saved for his father. In an Asian version, the father weaves a basket to throw his aged father into the river. A son says to bring back the basket so that it can be used for the father one day.

References

Grimms' Fairy Tales
Fictional families
Child characters in fairy tales
Male characters in fairy tales
Literary duos
ATU 850-999